TN Mobile, first introduced as Cell One and then as Leo, is a mobile telecommunications company in Namibia providing cellular and internet services. It is the second largest mobile operator in Namibia with  around 300.000 active subscribers. The company is 100% owned by Telecom Namibia, which is in turn wholly owned by the Namibian government.

In 2012, state-owned Telecom Namibia took full control of Leo, when the Communications Regulatory Authority of Namibia (CRAN) approved the takeover. The company was fully incorporated by Telecom Namibia in 2013 as its mobile division and renamed to TN Mobile (Telecom Namibia Mobile).

Telecom Namibia expanded and upgraded the network to a 4G LTE network with an IMS core enabling Telecom Namibia to offer FMC products a first for the Namibian market and pre-paid 4G LTE devices. Armando Perny is the current Chief Mobile Officer overseeing the GSM business.

References

Mobile phone companies of Namibia
Companies based in Windhoek
Telecommunications companies established in 2007
Namibian brands
Namibian companies established in 2007